Missbehavior is a 2019 Hong Kong film by Pang Ho-cheung. It is co-written by Pang and Sunny Lau.

Plot 
After June accidentally served her boss's breast milk to a client, she assembles a group of her estranged friends on WeChat to find a replacement bottle before her boss leaves.

Cast 
 Isabel Chan — Isabel
 Dada Chan — Rosalin Lin
 Gigi Leung — May, the policewoman
  — June, the office worker searching for breast milk
  — Frank
  — Boris
Isabella Leong — June's boss, Luna Fu
Patrick Tse — the important client

Production
The film was shot over 14 days with a heavy use of improvisation.

Release and reception
It was released over Chinese New Year. Edmund Lee of the South China Morning Post gave the film three of five stars and wrote that while he liked the wordplay humour the script was "hit or miss". Arturo Arredondo for the Georgia Asian Times gave the film four out of five stars, praising the cast's acting and improvisational skills. Elizabeth Kerr of The Hollywood Reporter praised the film's blend of coarse and witty humor but noted its regional Hong Kong idiosyncrasies as a barrier for international appeal.

References

External links
 

Hong Kong comedy films
2019 comedy films
2019 films